Janakbar (also Romanized as Jānakbar) is a village in Kenar Sar Rural District, Kuchesfahan District, Rasht County, Gilan Province, Iran. At the 2006 census, its population was 268, in 74 families.

References 

Populated places in Rasht County